Kamaleswarar Temple is a Hindu temple located in the neighbourhood of Pudupet in Chennai, India. The temple is popular due to its association with the 18th century dubash, Pachaiyappa Mudaliar.

References 

 

Hindu temples in Chennai